Jaitpura Gudha is a village in Bhind District and it comes under Gudha Gram Panchayat which comes under Mihona Tehsil and it comes under Lahar Vidhan Sabha which is an assembly constituency in Bhind district in the Indian state of Madhya Pradesh. As of 2011 India census, Jaitpura Gudha has a population of over 1778.

References 

Villages in Bhind district